Umamaheswari R is an Indian dubbing artist. She made her debut with Kalavani for heroine voices. She is currently working in Tamil, Malayalam and Telugu industry and has dubbed more than fifty Tamil feature films.

Filmography

References

Living people
Indian voice actresses
Year of birth missing (living people)